Rishtey Biktay Hain is a 2019 Pakistani family drama television series on ARY Digital, produced by Fahad Mustafa and Dr. Ali Kazmi under their production banner Big Bang Entertainment. It has Zubab Rana, Ali Abbas, Asad Siddiqui, Saniya Shamshad, Rubina Ashraf and Shagufta Ejaz in pivotal roles.

Cast
Zubab Rana as Zeba
Ali Abbas as Affan
Saniya Shamshad as Hania 
Asad Siddiqui as Hammad
Ammara Chaudhary as Rida 
Shagufta Ejaz as Farhat
Rubina Ashraf as Khalda
Mohammed Ahmed as Sharafat
Arsalan Faisal as Babar

References

2019 Pakistani television series debuts
2019 Pakistani television series endings